Abraham Jurgen Steyn (born 2 May 1992) is a South African-born rugby union player who plays for the Italy national rugby union team. His usual position is as a flanker, and he currently plays for Benetton.

For 2014–15 Pro12 season, he named as Permit Player for Zebre in Pro 12.

In 2012 he played for S.A. Under 20. From 2016 he is member of Italy squad and on 18 August 2019, he was named in the final 31-man squad for the 2019 Rugby World Cup. On 8 November 2021 he was named in the Italy A squad for the 2021 end-of-year rugby union internationals.

References

External links

Treviso Profile
Pro12 Profile

1992 births
Living people
People from Cradock, Eastern Cape
Italian rugby union players
Italy international rugby union players
Rugby union flankers
Zebre Parma players
Mogliano Rugby players
Sharks (Currie Cup) players
Rugby Calvisano players
Benetton Rugby players